Pau Ribas Tossas (born 2 March 1987) is a Spanish professional basketball player for Joventut Badalona of the Spanish Liga ACB. His father, Jordi Ribas, was also a professional basketball player.

Professional career
Ribas played with Prat, and then with the Spanish ACB League club Joventut Badalona, before joining the Spanish EuroLeague club Caja Laboral in 2009. In July 2012, he signed a three-year deal with Valencia Basket.

On 23 July 2015, he signed a three-year deal with FC Barcelona Lassa. After winning the 2015 Supercopa, Ribas was named the Supercopa MVP. On 26 October 2016, Ribas had a season-ending injury and was out for the rest of the 2016–17 season after just three EuroLeague games. On 17 July 2018, he re-signed with FC Barcelona Lassa on a three-year deal. On 4 July 2020, it was announced that Ribas had mutually parted ways with the Catalan club after five seasons.

Spain national teams
Ribas played internationally with the Spain junior national teams at the 2005 FIBA Europe Under-18 Championship, and at the 2006 FIBA Europe Under-20 Championship. They won the silver medal at the 2007 FIBA Europe Under-20 Championship.

With the senior Spain national team, Ribas won gold medal at the EuroBasket 2015 and at the 2019 FIBA Basketball World Cup.

Career statistics

EuroLeague

|-
| style="text-align:left;"| 2008–09
| style="text-align:left;"| Joventut
| 10 || 4 || 19.8 || .383 || .313 || .778 || 1.4 || 2.3 || 1.2 || .0 || 7.0 || 5.9
|-
| style="text-align:left;"| 2009–10
| style="text-align:left;" rowspan=3| Baskonia
| 20 || 15 || 20.2 || .391 || .360 || 1.000 || 2.0 || 2.1 || .5 || .1 || 4.5 || 4.3
|-
| style="text-align:left;"| 2010–11
| 20 || 2 || 12.9 || .444 || .320 || .200 || 1.6 || 1.0 || .5 || .0 || 2.5 || 2.8
|-
| style="text-align:left;"| 2011–12
| 10 || 3 || 17.5 || .420 || .176 || .875 || 2.5 || 1.8 || .9 || .0 || 5.2 || 5.3
|-
| style="text-align:left;"| 2014–15
| style="text-align:left;"| Valencia
| 10 || 4 || 24.1 || .489 || .439 || .769 || 2.3 || 3.6 || 1.1 || .0 || 11.8 || 12.3
|-
| style="text-align:left;"| 2015–16
| style="text-align:left;"| Barcelona
| 27 || 4 || 18.5 || .447 || .424 || .939 || 1.9 || 2.7 || .7 || .0 || 6.1 || 7.6
|-
| style="text-align:left;"| 2016–17
| style="text-align:left;"| Barcelona
| 2 || 0 || 9.5 || .000 || .500 || .000 || .5 || .5 || .5 || .0 || 4.5 || 3.5
|- class="sortbottom"
| style="text-align:left;"| Career
| style="text-align:left;"|
| 97 || 32 || 18.3 || .433 || .366 || .827 || 1.9 || 2.2 || .7 || .0 || 5.6 || 6.0

Awards and accomplishments

Club honours
FIBA EuroCup: 2005–06
EuroCup: 2007–08, 2013–14
Spanish League: 2009–10
Spanish King's Cup: 2008, 2018 and 2019
Spanish Supercup: 2015

Spain national team
Senior
 EuroBasket 2015: 
World Cup 2019 : 
Under-20
2007 FIBA Europe Under-20 Championship:

Personal
Ribas is known for his frequent take on political stances. He has also written articles for the Catalan newspaper Ara, known for its Catalan nationalist and independentist editorial policy.

References

External links

 Pau Ribas at acb.com 
 Pau Ribas at draftexpress.com
 Pau Ribas at eurobasket.com
 Pau Ribas at euroleague.net
 

1987 births
Living people
2019 FIBA Basketball World Cup players
Basketball players from Barcelona
CB Prat players
FC Barcelona Bàsquet players
Joventut Badalona players
Liga ACB players
Point guards
Saski Baskonia players
Shooting guards
Small forwards
Spanish men's basketball players
Valencia Basket players
FIBA Basketball World Cup-winning players